Mama Let Him Play is the first album by the Canadian singer, songwriter and guitarist, Jerry Doucette, backed by his band, Doucette. The album was certified Platinum in Canada (in excess of 100,000 copies sold) in 1978. It reached #43 on the Canadian charts.

Track listing
All songs are written by Jerry Doucette unless otherwise noted.
 "Down the Road" - 3:36
 "Back Off" - 2:29
 "When She Loves Me" - 3:57
 "People Say" - 2:38
 "All I Wanna Do" (Brent Shindell, Jerry Doucette, Mark Olson) - 5:42
 "Mama Let Him Play" - 4:26
 "What's Your Excuse?" - 3:13
 "It's Gonna Hurt So Bad" - 3:38
 "Keep On Running" - 3:09
 "Love Is Gonna Find You" - 5:04

Personnel
Musicians
 Jerry Doucette - vocals, lead and 12-string rhythm guitar
 Don Cummings - bass guitar; harmony vocals on "All I Wanna Do"
 Duris Maxwell - drums, percussion
 Robbie King - organ, piano, clavinet, Fender Rhodes piano
 Brent Shindell - rhythm guitar, acoustic guitar, harmony vocals
 Dale Jacobs - string synthesizer on "Love Is Gonna Find You"

Production
 Rolf Hennemann - producer, engineer
 Marty Lewis - co-producer (tracks 1, 5, 8, 10)
 Loren Salazar - design, artwork
 Jeff Tolman - assistant engineer
 Chuck Kuhn - photography
 Buck Davis - art coordination

References

1977 debut albums
Rock albums by Canadian artists